Pseudoniscidae is an extinct family of synziphosurine chelicerates that lived in the Silurian. Pseudoniscidae is classified inside the clade Planaterga, alongside Bunodidae and Dekatriata (chasmataspidids, eurypterids and arachnids). Pseudoniscidae is composed by two genera, Cyamocephalus and Pseudoniscus (the type genus).

References 

Synziphosurina
Planaterga
Silurian first appearances
Silurian arthropods
Silurian extinctions
Prehistoric arthropod families